Syncytin-2 also known as endogenous retrovirus group FRD member 1 is a protein that in humans is encoded by the ERVFRD-1 gene. This protein plays a key role in the implantation of human embryos  in the womb.

This gene is conserved among all primates, with an estimated age of 45 million years. The receptor for this fusogenic env protein is MFSD2. The mouse syncytins are not true orthologues.

The virus, along with some very similar insertions, belong to a group under the Gammaretrovirus-like class I ERVs. Similar ERVs are found in artiodactyls, a result of an independent integration event. A proposed nomenclature suggests putting all such "class I" elements in a genus-level taxon separate from Gammaretrovirus.

References

Further reading 

 
 
 
 
 

Endogenous retroviruses